Jamia Qasim Ul Uloom Multan is an Deobandi religious educational centre in Multan, Pakistan. The seminary was established in 1946 by Mufti Mahmood. 

In October 1946, Hussain Ahmad Madani visited Multan for formal inauguration and special prayer. 

Asad Mehmood is the current chancellor of Jamia.

Notable alumni 

 Abdul Majeed Ludhianvi
 Allah Wasaya
 Maulana Abdullah Ghazi
 Muhammad Musa Ruhani Bazi
 Noor Muhammad

References 

Islamic universities and colleges in Pakistan
Islamic schools in Pakistan
Deobandi Islamic universities and colleges
Educational institutions established in 1946
Multan
Jamia Qasim Ul Uloom